Bankura Government Polytechnic is a government polytechnic located in Bankura, West Bengal. This polytechnic is affiliated to the West Bengal State Council of Technical Education, and recognized by AICTE, New Delhi. This polytechnic offers diploma courses in Electrical, Mechanical and Metallurgical Engineering.

References

External links

Universities and colleges in Bankura district
Technical universities and colleges in West Bengal
Educational institutions established in 2013
2013 establishments in West Bengal